The Shangqiu–Dengfeng Expressway, abbreviated as Shangdeng Expressway and designated as S60 in Henan's expressway system, is  long regional expressway in Henan, China.

History
The Shangqiu–Zhengzhou Airport Economy Zone section was opened in 2015 and the whole expressway was opened in 2017.

List of exits

References

Expressways in Henan
Transport in Henan
Expressways in Zhengzhou